Uliyakovil or Uliyakkovil is a thickly populated neighbourhood of the city of Kollam, India. It is the 11th ward in Kollam Municipal Corporation, Kerala. Uliyakovil is one of the major contributors to the city's seafood exports. There is a publication house also.

Description
Uliyakovil is a neighbourhood of Kollam city that shares its borders with lake Ashtamudi. Previously there were two different municipal councils for this huge area (Uliyakovil West and Uliyakovil East), but they merged and formed a single council in 2005. Some of the major city roads pass through this area.

Uliyakovil has a lot of area which looks into the backwaters of Ashtamudi Kayal.

The Uliyakovil area once a rural village is soon transforming into an urban area with real estate costs skyrocketing. And with close proximity to hospitals, schools in Kollam city and other main institutions it is back on the map. There was a proposal from Kollam Municipal Corporation and ex-MLA from Kollam constituency, P. K. Gurudasan for the preparation of a detailed project report for the construction of a bypass road connecting the Kollam-Theni National Highway-208 from Kollam city to Kundara via Nair’s Hospital junction, Uliyakovil, Mangad and Thannikkamukku, but the project still has not materialised.

A publication firm Harisri publication is working here from 2003

Public/private institutions near Uliyakovil
 City Central School™
 Mangalasseri Cars
 Dr. Nair's Hospital
 Kings Marine Products
 ESIC Model & Super Speciality Hospital
 St. Mary's English Medium Public School
 Apparel Training and Design Centre
 R.P.Bankers
 T.I.M.E Kids Preschool
 Harisri Publications

References

Neighbourhoods in Kollam